Rivière-à-Claude is a municipality in the Gaspésie-Îles-de-la-Madeleine region of the province of Quebec in Canada. In addition to Rivière-à-Claude itself, the municipality also includes the community of Ruisseau-à-Rebours.

History

The first permanent settlers arrived in 1860. The settlement, originally called Duchesnay after senator Édouard-Louis-Antoine-Charles Juchereau Duchesnay (1809-1886), gained a post office in 1879 and grew to 200 persons by 1888. In 1898, the Parish of Saint-Évagre was founded.

In 1923, the place was incorporated. In 1968, the municipality was renamed to Rivière-à-Claude after the Claude River that has its source near the municipality's inland boundary. This river may be named in honour of a pioneer named Joseph Glaude, but there is no certainty since various spellings have existed over time.

Demographics

Population

See also
 List of municipalities in Quebec

References 

Incorporated places in Gaspésie–Îles-de-la-Madeleine
Municipalities in Quebec